{{DISPLAYTITLE:C8H18S}}
The molecular formula C8H18S (molar mass: 146.294 g/mol, exact mass: 146.1129 u) may refer to:

 2-Methyl-2-heptanethiol
 1-Octanethiol, or 1-mercaptooctane

Molecular formulas